The Hughes H-1 Racer is a racing aircraft built by Hughes Aircraft in 1935. It set a world airspeed record and a transcontinental speed record across the United States. The H-1 Racer was the last aircraft built by a private individual to set the world speed record; most aircraft to hold the record since have been military designs.

Development
During his work on his movie Hell's Angels, Howard Hughes employed Glenn Odekirk to maintain the fleet of over 100 aircraft used in the production. The two men shared a common interest in aviation and hatched a plan to build a record-beating aircraft. The aircraft was given many names, but is commonly known as the H-1. It was the first aircraft model produced by the Hughes Aircraft company.

Design
Streamlining was a paramount design criterion resulting in "one of the cleanest and most elegant aircraft designs ever built." Many groundbreaking technologies were developed during the construction process, including individually machined flush rivets that left the aluminium skin of the aircraft completely smooth. The  H-1 also had retractable landing gear to further increase the speed of the aircraft, including a fully retractable hydraulically actuated tail skid.

Due to two different roles being envisioned for the racing aircraft, a set of short-span wings for air racing and speed records and a set of "long" wings for cross-country racing were prepared.

Operational history

Hughes piloted the first flight on August 17, 1935 at Grand Central Airport in Glendale, California. A month later, on
13 September at Martin Field near Santa Ana, California, Hughes promptly broke the world landplane speed record clocking  averaged over four timed passes. The ship was loaded with a minimal amount of fuel to keep the weight down, and Hughes was not supposed to make the 3rd and 4th passes, exhausting the fuel supply. Hughes managed to crash-land in a beet field south of Santa Ana without serious damage to either himself or the H-1. When his compatriots arrived at the crash site Hughes said "We can fix her; she'll go faster." The previous landplane record was held Raymond Delmotte, averaging  in a Caudron C.460.

Hughes later implemented minor changes to the H-1 Racer to make it more suitable for a transcontinental speed record attempt. The most significant change was the fitting of a new, longer set of wings that gave the aircraft a lower wing loading. On January 19, 1937, a year and a half after his previous landplane speed record in the H-1, Hughes set a new transcontinental speed record by flying non-stop from Los Angeles to New York City in 7 hours, 28 minutes and 25 seconds. He smashed his own previous record of 9 hours, 27 minutes by two hours.

Considering the contemporary service aircraft were biplanes, Hughes fully expected the United States Army Air Corps (USAAC) to embrace his aircraft's new design and make the H-1 the basis for a new generation of U.S. fighter aircraft. His efforts to "sell" the design were unsuccessful. In postwar testimony before the Senate, Hughes indicated that resistance to the innovative design was the basis for the USAAC rejection of the H-1: "I tried to sell that airplane to the Army but they turned it down because at that time the Army did not think a cantilever monoplane was proper for a pursuit ship..."

Aviation writer William Wraga states that the H-1 Racer inspired later radial engine fighters such as the Republic P-47 Thunderbolt, the Mitsubishi A6M Zero  and the Focke-Wulf Fw 190, without offering any arguments for that being the case other than "Hughes showed them how it should be done." After the war, Hughes claimed that "it was quite apparent to everyone that the Japanese Zero fighter had been copied from the Hughes H-1 Racer." He claimed both the wing shape, the tail design and the general similarity of the Zero and his racer. Jiro Horikoshi, designer of the Mitsubishi Zero strongly denied the allegation of the Hughes H-1 influencing the design of the Japanese fighter aircraft. Naval histrographer Drachinifel concludes that Hughes was gravely mistaken, as virtually nothing in shape or capabilities is shared between the two aircraft.

The Hughes H-1 Racer is featured in the 1940 RKO Radio Pictures movie Men Against the Sky.

Disposition

The original H-1 Racer was donated to the Smithsonian in 1975 and is on display at the National Air and Space Museum.

Replicas

A non-flying replica was displayed in the National Air Race Museum from 1993 to 1994, after which it was placed in storage.

Jim Wright of Cottage Grove, Oregon built a full-scale replica of the H-1 that he first flew in 2002. His replica was so close to the original that the FAA granted it serial number 2 of the model. His achievement in recreating the aircraft was heralded in many aviation magazines.

On August 4, 2003, Wright unveiled his H-1 replica at the 2003 AirVenture at Oshkosh, Wisconsin. On his way home to Oregon, he refueled the aircraft in Gillette, Wyoming. Wright met briefly with local reporters and said that the aircraft had been having propeller "gear problems." An hour after taking off, the aircraft crashed just north of the Old Faithful Geyser in Yellowstone National Park, killing Wright. The replica, slated to be used in the film The Aviator, was completely destroyed.  The official accident report detailed the failure of a counterweight on the constant speed propeller. On December 17, 2003, Cottage Grove State Airport was dedicated as Jim Wright Field.

A static replica H-1 was displayed on a pole alongside Hughes’ “Spruce Goose” at Long Beach when the latter aircraft was displayed in a dome adjacent to the Queen Mary. Other non-flying replicas are displayed at the Thomas T. Beam Engineering Complex at the University of Nevada, Las Vegas (donated by the Howard Hughes Corporation in 1988) and the Santa Maria Museum of Flight. , another H-1 replica is being built at the San Diego Air & Space Museum.

Specifications (H-1 Racer, original wings)

Gallery

References
Notes

Citations

Bibliography

 

 Matt, Paul and Kenn C. Rust. "Howard Hughes and the Hughes Racer." Historical Aviation Album XVI. Temple City, California: Historical Aviation Album, 1980. .

External links

 Howard Hughes - Aviator, (UNLV) Library website
 Wright Tools - History of the H-1
 The H-1 Racer - National Air and Space Museum website 
 Hughes Racer
 The Silver Bullet: No airplane in the world could outshine Howard Hughes' H-1 Racer until Jim Wright built a copy of it
 Hughes H-1 Racer, many technical details and pictures (German)

Racing aircraft
Howard Hughes
Hughes Aircraft Company
1930s United States sport aircraft
Single-engined tractor aircraft
Aircraft first flown in 1935